Lord of the Ants (also known as The Lord of the Ants) is a 2022 Italian biographical drama film co-written and directed by Gianni Amelio.

The film was entered into the main competition at the 79th edition of the Venice Film Festival.

Plot
A chronicle of the 1964-8 judicial affair involving homosexual writer Aldo Braibanti, accused of having mentally manipulated two lovers.

Cast 

Luigi Lo Cascio as Aldo Braibanti
Elio Germano as Ennio Scribani
Leonardo Maltese as Ettore Tagliaferri
Davide Vecchi as Riccardo Tagliaferri
Sara Serraiocco as Graziella
Anna Caterina Antonacci as Ettore's Mother 
Valerio Binasco as Prosecutor

Reception
On Rotten Tomatoes, the film has an approval rating of 67% based on 6 reviews."

References

External links

2022 drama films
Italian drama films  
2020s Italian-language films
2020s Italian films
Biographical films
LGBT-related drama films
Films directed by Gianni Amelio
2022 LGBT-related films
Italian LGBT-related films